Mohammad Ali Mardani is an Iranian football forward who currently plays for Iranian football club Padideh in the Persian Gulf Pro League.

Club career

Padideh
He joined Padideh in summer 2015 with two-years contract. He made his debut for Padideh in 2015–16 Iran Pro League against Saba Qom as substitute for Younes Shakeri. icipating in the 2014 AFC U-19 Championship.

Club career statistics

References

External links
 Mohammad Ali Mardani at IranLeague

1994 births
Living people
Iranian footballers
Shahr Khodro F.C. players
Association football forwards
People from Masjed Soleyman
Sportspeople from Khuzestan province